Jeffrey Revell-Reade (born 1964/65) is a London-based Australian businessman specializing in boiler room fraud.

In 2014, he was sentenced to eight and a half years in prison, along with his British accomplice Anthony May, for seven years and four months, both for conspiracy to defraud.

Revell-Reade lives in a £5 million house in Wimbledon, south London.

References

1960s births
Australian fraudsters
Living people